Ponderay is a city in Bonner County, Idaho. The population was 1,137 at the 2010 census, up from 638 in 2000. Ponderay's city motto is "Little City with the Big Future". Its name is an English phonetic spelling of the French words “Pend Oreille”, the name of the lake the city sits upon.

History
Ponderay's original plat was filed in Kootenai County on May 5, 1904. It was incorporated as the Village of Ponderay on May 27, 1947, and became the City of Ponderay on November 26, 1968. Ponderay was built on the site of the company town of the Panhandle Smelting and Refining Company.

Geography

Demographics

2010 census
At the 2010 census there were 1,137 people in 521 households, including 277 families, in the city. The racial makeup of the city was 94.5% White, 0.3% African American, 0.7% Native American, 0.1% Asian, 0.9% from other races, and 3.5% from two or more races. Hispanic or Latino of any race were 4.2%.

Of the 521 households 29.0% had children under the age of 18 living with them, 34.7% were married couples living together, 12.7% had a female householder with no husband present, 5.8% had a male householder with no wife present, and 46.8% were non-families. 38.2% of households were one person and 10.3% were one person aged 65 or older. The average household size was 2.17 and the average family size was 2.86.

The median age was 34 years. 23.5% of residents were under the age of 18; 11.7% were between the ages of 18 and 24; 26.3% were from 25 to 44; 27% were from 45 to 64; and 11.5% were 65 or older. The gender makeup of the city was 46.9% male and 53.1% female.

2000 census
At the 2000 census there were 638 people in 264 households, including 168 families, in the city. The racial makeup of the city was 97.02% White, 0.47% African American, 0.63% Native American, 1.10% Asian, 0.31% from other races, and 0.47% from two or more races. Hispanic or Latino of any race were 0.31%.

Of the 264 households 29.2% had children under the age of 18 living with them, 50.0% were married couples living together, 6.8% had a female householder with no husband present, and 36.0% were non-families. 26.1% of households were one person and 8.0% were one person aged 65 or older.  The average household size was 2.38 and the average family size was 2.88.

The age distribution was 25.7% under the age of 18, 8.3% from 18 to 24, 27.4% from 25 to 44, 27.0% from 45 to 64, and 11.6% 65 or older.  The median age was 37 years. For every 100 females, there were 117.7 males.  For every 100 females age 18 and over, there were 106.1 males.

The median household income was $27,853 and the median family income  was $30,227. Males had a median income of $26,875 versus $15,917 for females. The per capita income for the city was $13,432.  About 13.2% of families and 15.7% of the population were below the poverty line, including 20.9% of those under age 18 and none of those age 65 or over.

References

External links
 City of Ponderay
 Ponderay Police Department

Cities in Bonner County, Idaho
Cities in Idaho